Kinosternon is a genus of small aquatic turtles from the Americas known commonly as mud turtles.

Geographic range
They are found in the United States, Mexico, Central America, and South America. The greatest species richness is in Mexico, and only three species (K. dunni, K. leucostomum, and K. scorpioides) are found in South America.

Description
They are very similar to the musk turtles, but generally smaller in size, and their carapaces are not as highly domed.

Diet
All mud turtles are carnivorous, consuming various aquatic invertebrates, fish, and even carrion.

Species

Extant 

Central Chiapas  mud turtle - K. abaxillare (Baur, 1925)
Tabasco mud turtle - K. acutum Gray, 1831
Alamos mud turtle - K. alamosae Berry & Legler, 1980
Central American mud turtle - K. angustipons Legler, 1965
Striped mud turtle - K. baurii (Garman, 1891)
Jalisco mud turtle - K. chimalhuaca Berry, Seidel, & Iverson, 1996
Cora mud turtle - K. cora Loc-Barragán et al., 2020
Creaser's mud turtle - K. creaseri Hartweg, 1934
Dunn's mud turtle - K. dunni Schmidt, 1947
Durango mud turtle - K. durangoense Iverson, 1979
Yellow mud turtle - K. flavescens (Agassiz, 1857)
Herrera's mud turtle - K. herrerai Stejneger, 1925
Rough-footed mud turtle - K. hirtipes (Wagler, 1830)
Valley of Mexico mud turtle - K. h. hirtipes (Wagler, 1830)
Lake Chapala mud turtle - K. h. chapalaense Iverson, 1981
San Juanico mud turtle - K. h. magdalense Iverson, 1981
Viesca mud turtle - K. h. megacephalum Iverson, 1981 (extinct)
Mexican plateau mud turtle - K. h. murrayi Glass and Hartweg, 1951
Patzcuarco mud turtle - K. h. tarascense Iverson, 1981
Mexican mud turtle - K. integrum (LeConte, 1954)
White-lipped mud turtle - K. leucostomum A.M.C. Duméril, Bibron & A.H.A. Duméril, 1851
Northern white-lipped mud turtle - K. l. leucostomum A.M.C. Duméril, Bibron & A.H.A. Duméril, 1851
Southern white-lipped mud turtle - K. l. postinguinale (Cope, 1887)
Oaxaca mud turtle - K. oaxacae Berry & Iverson, 1980
Scorpion mud turtle - K. scorpioides (Linnaeus, 1766)
Scorpion mud turtle (subspecies) - K. s. scorpioides (Linnaeus, 1766)
White-throated mud turtle - K. s. albogulare (A.H.A. Duméril and Bocourt, 1870)
Red-cheeked mud turtle - K. s. cruentatum (A.M.C. Duméril, Bibron & A.H.A. Duméril, 1851)
Sonora mud turtle - K. sonoriense (Le Conte, 1854)
Sonora mud turtle (subspecies) - K. s. sonoriense (Le Conte, 1854)
Sonoyta mud turtle - K. s. longifemorale (Iverson, 1981)
Florida mud turtle - K. steindachneri (Siebenrock, 1906)
Arizona mud turtle - K. stejnegeri Gilmore, 1923
Eastern mud turtle - K. subrubrum (Bonnaterre, 1789)
Eastern mud turtle (subspecies) - K. s. subrubrum (Bonnaterre, 1789)
Mississippi mud turtle - K. s. hippocrepis (Bonnaterre, 1789)
Vallarta mud turtle - K. vogti López-Luna et al., 2018

Extinct 
†Kinosternon arizonense Gilmore, 1923 (known from Plio-Pleistocene fossil remains, formerly considered conspecific with K. stejnegeri)

References

Bibliography

 
Turtle genera
Taxa named by Johann Baptist von Spix